James Carlton may refer to:
James Carlton (actor) (born 1977), English actor
James Carlton (athlete) (1909–1951), Australian sprinter
Jim Carlton (1935–2015), Australian politician